St Edeyrn's Church is a listed Anglican church within the boundary of Old St Mellon's, Cardiff, though giving its name to the nearby area of Llanedeyrn.

Foundation
St Edeyrn's is one of a number of ancient Christian sites which were established soon after the founding of Llandaff Cathedral, as the Celtic church was anxious to spread itself through the region as swiftly as possible in order to secure its position. Saint Edeyrn and his associate Saint Isan were amongst the missionaries sent by Saint Teilo to perform this work. Isan founded the church in what is now Llanishen with Edeyrn. Edeyrn later founded a religious community on the banks of the Rhymney River (then Renis River). He is reputedly buried in the churchyard.

Later history
After the Norman Conquest, the church was rebuilt and became a chapel of ease to St Mary's. In the 12th Century, it was recognised as the property of Tewkesbury Abbey, though returned to the Bishop of Llandaff in 1236, at which time it became a separate parish. Five of the bells which the tower currently houses date from 1766. An extensive restoration occurred in 1888 when the east chancel wall was completely rebuilt.

Twentieth century
The church was transferred to the new Diocese of Monmouth after the creation of the Church in Wales. It is currently in the Cyncoed Ministry Area, which it shares with All Saints (Cyncoed), All Saints (Llanedeyrn) and St David's (Pentwyn). The church gained listed status in 1963, after which the machine-made tiles of the roof were replaced with Welsh slate. An additional bell was acquired in 1994.

References

Grade II* listed churches in Cardiff
St Mellons
Commonwealth War Graves Commission cemeteries in Wales